Brooklands Members (BM) are the official support group for Brooklands Museum in Weybridge, Surrey, England. It is governed by a charitable trust. The BTM's main aims are to financially support and promote Brooklands Museum. Principally funds are raised for the Museum through subscriptions to the BTM and by additional fund raising activities throughout the year such as an annual Classic Car Show & Jumble, a series of popular talks and other events The BTM also fund specific projects such as the restoration of the Pratts petrol pagoda which was opened in October 2010 by Prince Michael of Kent, the replacement of the Test Hill railings and the recreation of the iconic Brooklands Scoreboard. In 2019 the group funded an exhibition at Brooklands for the first time – the First to Fastest exhibition featured the Museum's Vickers Vimy and the Transatlantic air race winning Harrier from 1969.

History
Construction of Brooklands motor racing circuit began in 1906 after the land owner, Hugh Fortescue Locke-King, visited the Targa Florio and Brescia, Italy and wanted to create a place in England where motor racing could occur away from normal public roads. The track was constructed in less than a year opening in 1907. It flourished as both a motor racing circuit and aviation centre until 1914 and the advent of World War I. Reopening in 1920 Brooklands once again became prominent in motor racing and aviation. In 1939 the circuit was closed once again and did not re open.

After many years of industrial neglect, the site now being owned by Vickers (later British Aircraft Corporation and British Aerospace), the Brooklands Society formed in 1967 with the intention to preserve as much of the remaining track and buildings as possible. Following the sale of the land by British Aerospace a charitable trust was formed in 1987 with the intention of starting a Museum dedicated to the Brooklands site and based on the original 1907 clubhouse. Following negotiations with the new landowners, Gallaghers, the Museum was established on thirty acres surrounding the clubhouse including the Members banking and Test Hill.

To raise funds and support for the Museum two new groups were formed, principally the Friends of Brooklands Museum but also a more prestigious entity the Brooklands Club. After the initial renovation, the Museum opened in 1991 displaying artifacts from both motoring and aviation related to the Brooklands site.

In 2007 a move was made to amalgamate the support groups for the Museum which resulted in two of them, the Friends of Brooklands Museum and the Brooklands Club joining to form the Brooklands Trust Members under the auspices of the Brooklands Museum Trust. The Brooklands Society remained independent from the Museum itself.

The BTM was officially launched in the Summer of 2008 with its first full season of activity the following year. The first chairman of the new group was Philip Strickland and the vice-chairmen were Robert Hall and Ian Macgregor. The president of the BTM was Sir Stirling Moss and he was welcomed at an inaugural dinner held at Brooklands in December 2009.

Ian MacGregor died in December 2010 and Robert Hall retained the vice-chair at the 2011 AGM.

Philip Strickland stood down as the founding chairman at the 2014 AGM. Neil Bailey replaced him as chairman and Julian Grimwade joined Robert Hall as joint vice-chairmen, Robert stood down from the role in 2019.

Present day
By early 2020 the BTM had around 6,400 memberships worldwide, reaching around 19,000 people through those memberships. It publishes a bi-monthly magazine for Members, the Brooklands Bulletin, which went from a monochrome newsletter to full colour A5 magazine production in January 2009. In 2019 the Bulletin was re-organised and a new editorial team put in place along with new publishers, Hine marketing, to produce an A4 full colour quality magazine.

There is a monthly e-mail newsletter for members only plus a website. The group also run social network pages on Facebook, Instagram, Flickr and Twitter.  It organises a series of well-received evening lectures for members at Brooklands Museum featuring speakers from the motoring and aviation fields. Additional special motorcycle events are hosted by former TT rider and Moto GP commentator Steve Parrish, and Motoring evenings hosted by commentator and journalist Simon Taylor and the editor in chief of Autocar, Steve Cropley. The group also organise motoring and aviation-related trips, holidays and events to benefit Membership.

The BM represents Brooklands Museum at numerous events and shows throughout the year which have included the Le Mans Classic and Goodwood Revival through their "Outreach" Team.

Tim Morris was the original BTM administrator/Membership Secretary from 2009. The Administration is based in an office at Brooklands Museum itself. Due to increased workload he was joined by a second staff member, Katharine Allen and later Jeni Larwood. In 2019 Sarah Dover took over the assistant role. They remain the only two salaried members of the BTM, all other committee and helpers are volunteers. Tim Morris retired in 2020 but continued as a volunteer with the Talks team, BM.tv and social media.

An offshoot of the Brooklands Members has been Brooklands Members.tv (BM.tv) A small group who organise all the Members' live talks at the Museum and also record videos of Brooklands life and events which are broadcast on their online channels on Vimeo and YouTube. They are principally produced by Mark Jarman, Tim Morris and Steve Clarke. In addition to the filmed output a monthly radio show called The Track was created in 2020 for broadcast on Brooklands Radio.

At the 2014 AGM Philip Strickland stood down as the founder chairman and Neil Bailey took the role.

In 2021 Neil Bailey is the current chairman with Julian Grimwade Vice Chairman. Kevin Lee is the secretary. The original group name of Brooklands Trust Members was shortened to Brooklands Members at the 2019 AGM following a re-branding exercise by Brooklands Museum.

In June 2018 Damon Hill OBE became the second President of the Brooklands Trust Members.

The Coronavirus pandemic has affected the members' organisation, as Brooklands Museum has been closed for a considerable amount of time, leading to a decline in membership numbers. The Museum re-opened in April 2021 on a limited basis and then further in May 2021.

References

External links
 Brooklands Members website
 Brooklands Museum website
 BM.tv Vimeo Channel

Organizations established in 2007
Charities based in Surrey
Museum organizations
Brooklands